Mordellochroidea is a genus of beetles in the family Mordellidae, containing the following species:

 Mordellochroidea castanea Ermisch, 1969
 Mordellochroidea lutea Ermisch, 1969

References

Mordellidae